The premier of Nunavut (Inuinnaqtun: Hivuliqti Nunavunmi)  is the first minister for the Canadian territory of Nunavut. The premier is the territory's head of government, although their powers are somewhat more limited than those of a provincial premier.

Unlike most other premiers who are officially appointed by a lieutenant governor or commissioner on account of their leadership of a majority bloc in the legislature, the premier, and the Cabinet, is directly elected by the non-partisan members of the Legislative Assembly of Nunavut, in accordance with the system of consensus government. The premier is formally appointed by the commissioner of Nunavut, who is bound to act on the Assembly's recommendation by both the Nunavut Act and convention.

History
The territory's first premier, Paul Okalik, was elected after the 1999 general elections. He was re-elected to a second term after the 2004 general elections. Although Okalik was re-elected to a third term after the 2008 general elections in the Iqaluit West riding, he was defeated by newly elected MLA Eva Aariak in the premiership vote on November 14. On 15 November, 2013, Peter Taptuna beat out Okalik and Paul Quassa for the position of premier. Quassa was elected in 2017 but lost a confidence vote in 2018 which lead to the election of Joe Savikataaq. P.J. Akeeagok was selected to become premier in the Nunavut Leadership Forum on November 17, 2021 defeating Savikataaq.

See also
 Prime Minister of Canada
 List of premiers of Nunavut

References

External links
 Premier of Nunavut Official Site
 Government of Nunavut

Nunavut
Politics of Nunavut
Lists of people from Nunavut

Nunavut politics-related lists